Adrien-Jean-Maximilien Vachette (born 9 January 1753 in Cauffry – deceased 23 September 1839 in Paris) was a French goldsmith best known for the production of ornate gold boxes and the use of unusual and natural materials like tortoiseshell.

Biography 

Adrien Vachette was born in Cauffry and possibly apprenticed with Pierre-François Drais, who sponsored him for a master's certificate 21 July 1779. He had a shop at Place Dauphine in Paris, and worked for a time with Marie-Etienne Nitot during the First Empire, and with the firm of Ouizille and Lemoine after the restoration of the monarchy: In 1816, Charles Ouizille and Adrien Vachette became the official jewellers of Louis XVIII's court.

Notable students include Jean-Valentin Morel, who apprenticed with Vachette before opening his own shop in Paris.

Work 

Adrien Vachette was a prolific designer and one of the most noted master craftsman of his generation. The use of unusual and natural materials like tortoise shell was characteristic of Vachette's work.

Vachette created the design for the Miraculous Medal, or the Medal of the Immaculate Conception, after Saint Catherine Labouré's vision of the Blessed Virgin Mary. He produced and sold over two million of the medals between 1832 and 1836.

Collections 

 The Louvre in Paris: 31 boxes signed by Vachette (16 from Ancient regime, 15 from post-revolution).
 Victoria and Albert Museum in London: 1 box painted by Jacques-Joseph de Gault
 Waddesdon Manor of the Rothschild Foundation: 4 boxes
Metropolitan Museum of Art: Cameo of the Virgin and Child and Snuffboxes
 Khalili Collection of Enamels of the World: 1 boîte à mouches

Gallery

References 

1753 births
1839 deaths
French goldsmiths
French jewellers
18th-century French businesspeople
19th-century French businesspeople